Hästveda is a locality situated in Hässleholm Municipality, Scania County, Sweden with 1,623 inhabitants in 2010.

The etymology of Hästveda indicates that the name originally signified a wood, or forest where horses were kept.

Hästveda Church is a medieval church with well-preserved both Romanesque and Gothic frescos.

Hästveda railway station is situated on the Southern Main Line and is served by the Växjö–Hässleholm route of the  regional rail network.

References 

Populated places in Hässleholm Municipality
Populated places in Skåne County